Daniel or Dan O'Brien may refer to:

Politicians and nobles
Daniel O'Brien, 1st Viscount Clare (1577–1663), MP for County Clare, younger son of Connor O'Brien, 3rd Earl of Thomond
Daniel O'Brien, 3rd Viscount Clare (fl. 1670–1691), son of Connor O'Brien, 2nd Viscount Clare
Daniel O'Brien, 4th Viscount Clare (died 1693), son of Daniel O'Brien, 3rd Viscount Clare
Daniel O'Brien (Jacobite) (1683–1759), Irish Jacobite soldier and diplomat
Daniel Pitt O'Brien (1900–1957), Secretary of State of West Virginia

Sportspeople

Athletes
Dan O'Brien (born 1966), American decathlete
Dan O'Brien (footballer) (1884–1917), Australian rules football player
Dan O'Brien (pitcher) (born 1954), American baseball player
Dan O'Brien (soccer) (born 1986), American soccer player
Danny O'Brien (gridiron football) (born 1990), American college football quarterback

Coaches / executives
Dan O'Brien (American football) (born 1963), American college football coach and administrator
Dan O'Brien (baseball coach) (born 1971), American college baseball coach
Dan O'Brien Sr. (1929–2017), American baseball executive, general manager of Rangers, Mariners, Angels
Dan O'Brien (baseball executive), American former baseball executive, general manager of Reds; son of Dan O'Brien Sr.

Writers / journalists
Daniel O'Brien (comedian) (born 1986), American humorist, writer and comedian
Dan O'Brien (author) (born 1947), American author and rancher
Dan O'Brien (playwright) (born 1974), American playwright
Dan O'Brien (sports journalist), American sports journalist, author and screenwriter
Danny O'Brien (journalist) (born 1969), British technology journalist

See also
Danny O'Brien (disambiguation)
Danielle O'Brien (born 1990), Australian ice dancer